Jastrebac is a mountain in central Serbia. It can also refer to other entities in Serbia:

Geography

 Jastrebac (Bujanovac), a village near Bujanovac
 Jastrebac (Vladičin Han), a village near Vladičin Han
 Jastrebac (Vlasotince), a village near Vlasotince
 Jastrebac (Zenica), a village in Zenica, Bosnia and Herzegovina

Sport

 FK Jastrebac Niš, football club